Laelian, also incorrectly referred to as Lollianus and Aelianus, was a usurper against Postumus, the emperor of the Gallic Empire. His revolt lasted from approximately late February to early June 269.

Origins
Little is known about Laelian. He shares the same nomen as a prominent Hispano-Roman family, the Ulpii, that included Trajan among its members, and may have been a relative.  This is supported by the strong allusion to Hispania on an aureus he struck, which featured the design of Hispania reclining with a rabbit to her side.  If he indeed was a relative, this may be the reason Hispania allied itself with Claudius II, after the death of Laelian, seemingly without a struggle.

Rule
Laelian declared himself emperor at Moguntiacum (modern-day Mainz in Germany) in February/March 269, after repulsing a Germanic invasion.  Although his exact position is unknown, he is believed to have been a senior officer under Postumus, either the legatus of Germania Superior or the commander of Legio XXII Primigenia. Laelian represented a strong danger to Postumus because of the two legions he commanded (Primigenia in Moguntiacum and VIII Augusta in Argentoratum); Despite this, his rebellion lasted only about two months before he was executed, reputedly by his own soldiers, or by Postumus' troops after a siege of Laelian's capital. The siege of Moguntiacum was also fatal for Postumus; it is said he was slain when he refused to allow his troops to plunder the city following its capture.

Laelian (under the Latin name Lollianus) is listed among the Thirty Tyrants in the Historia Augusta.

See also
 Ulpia gens
 List of Roman usurpers

References

Sources

Primary sources
 Aurelius Victor, Liber de Caesaribus
 Eutropius, Brevarium, Book 9
 Historia Augusta, The Thirty Tyrants

Secondary sources
 Southern, Pat. The Roman Empire from Severus to Constantine, Routledge, 2001
 Potter, David Stone, The Roman Empire at Bay, AD 180-395, Routledge, 2004
 Jones, A.H.M., Martindale, J.R. The Prosopography of the Later Roman Empire, Vol. I: AD260-395, Cambridge University Press, 1971
 Michel Polfer, "Laelianus (A.D. 269)", De Imperatoribus Romanis] (1999)

External links 

269 deaths
3rd-century monarchs in Europe
3rd-century murdered monarchs
Cornelii
Gallic emperors
Murdered Roman emperors
Thirty Tyrants (Roman)
Ulpii
Year of birth unknown